Cultuzz Digital Media GmbH is an IT and Internet company that specializes in software for e-commerce in the travel and tourism industry. It has its headquarters in Berlin, Germany and subsidiaries in Switzerland, India, UK and US. Its main product is CultSwitch which is a channel management solution allowing hotels to transfer their products, availability and prices to the different travel websites (source). Cultuzz is the only travel technical provider to be connected to the eBay API via XML technology. Since 2002, Cultuzz supports hotels to market and sell their hotel products and services on the eBay.

History

Cultuzz was founded in 2000 in Germany by Dr Reinhard Vogel 
Cultuzz developed a professional search engine for eBay in 2006, allowing the site's users to check availability and make actual bookings from hotel inventories. In 2008, Cultuzz offered the first complete interface to Tiscover, thus linking major distributors and portals directly with the accommodation providers  To enable hotel advertising on eBay for commission-free bookings, Cultuzz created professional microsites with unique special functions for eBay 

Cultuzz linked its channel management system CultSwitch to the four Global Distribution Systems (GDS) Amadeus, Sabre, Worldspan and Galileo, as well as to the Pegasus Online Distribution Database (ODD) for  making partner hotels of Cultuzz reach every travel agency worldwide 

In March, 2011, RateTiger integrated with Cultuzz enabling its hotels to generate bookings from eBay, making it the only service provider worldwide that implemented direct bookings for hotels on eBay

Around the same time, agoda.com also partnered with Cultuzz Media giving them the ability to offer people a greater choice of hotels across Europe

Products

 CultBay - A checkout solution that allows users to buy a voucher for the offers listed on a site but also to carry out booking at the same time. This has been integrated into the eBay purchase procedure enabling it to become a full scale booking platform for travel services.
 CultSwitch - It is a channel management software that allows hotels to manage their online inventory across various distribution channels using a single interface. This innovative hotel data administration system helps hotel management to save enormous amount of time and resources. Hotel prices and descriptions are saved on a secure web server of Cultuzz and distributed via OTA-standard interfaces to several booking partners.
 CultBooking - It is a “free to download” hotel booking system made available as an open source product for hoteliers, owners of pensions, hotel chains and destination marketing organisations.

Awards and recognition

 In 2004, Cultuzz received the eBay Award in the category of "Most Innovative Vertical Solution" for its product CultBay.
 In 2012, Cultuzz received the PCI compliant certification. This confirmed that the company's IT systems have been checked by  according to the Payment Card Industry Data Security Standard (PCI DSS)

References

Software companies of Germany
Technology companies established in 2000
Companies based in Berlin